Riley Park–Little Mountain is a neighbourhood in Vancouver, British Columbia. Its boundaries are 41st Avenue to the south, 16th Avenue to the north, Cambie Street to the west, and Fraser Street to the east.  The main commercial thoroughfare of the neighbourhood is Main Street.

Parks
Little Mountain is the former name of a quarry located at what is now Queen Elizabeth Park.  The quarry garden at the park is one of the most popular places in Vancouver. There is a pitch and putt and a disc golf course at Queen Elizabeth Park, as well as the Seasons In The Park restaurant. 

Hillcrest Park is a park in the north-east section of the neighbourhood, with Hillcrest Community Centre located in the park. The park includes an aquatic centre, fitness centre, ice rink, gymnasium, indoor cycling, multi-purpose rooms, a games room, dance studio, playgrounds, childcare centre, and a Blue Parrot Coffee.

Sports
Nat Bailey Stadium is a baseball stadium used by the Vancouver Canadians, a Minor League Baseball team. Nat Bailey Stadium was originally named Capilano Stadium, before being renamed in honour of Nat Bailey. 

Little Mountain Baseball is located in the north-east corner of Hillcrest Park and is a little league baseball team.

See also
 Hillcrest Park, a nearby park in Riley Park–Little Mountain

References

Neighbourhoods in Vancouver